Celestino Caballero (born June 21, 1976) is a Panamanian former professional boxer who competed from 1998 to 2014. He held world championships in two weight classes, including the unified WBA (Super) and IBF super bantamweight titles between 2006 and 2010, and the WBA (Regular) featherweight title from 2011 to 2012.

Professional career
Caballero began boxing professionally in 1998. During the majority of his early career, Caballero won a number of minor regional championships: the Panamanian, WBA Fedecentro, WBA Fedelatin, WBO Latino, and NABA Super Bantamweight titles.

He had won the first four of his titles and had a record of 17-0 before losing by a third-round knockout to José Rojas on May 16, 2003.

Seven months later, Caballero won the vacant NABA title by defeating Giovanni Andrade.  The fight, which was held in Coconut Creek, Florida, was Caballero's first one outside of Panama. In his next fight, back in Panama, Caballero was knocked down in the tenth round and lost the title by unanimous decision to Ricardo Cordoba on May 25, 2004.

On February 17, 2005, Caballero fought the then unbeaten and would-be world champion Daniel Ponce de León in Hollywood, California. Caballero, who was a heavy underdog, won the bout by unanimous decision.

On October 15, 2005, Caballero defeated Yober Ortega by unanimous decision for the WBA Super Bantamweight interim championship.  He defended the title on February 4, 2006 against Roberto Bonilla. After knocking down Bonilla in the third and fifth rounds, Caballero won via TKO in the seventh.

WBA super bantamweight champion
Caballero fought against WBA world Super Bantamweight champion Somsak Sithchatchawal in Sithchatchawal's native country of Thailand on October 4, 2006 in order to win the real WBA title. He won by TKO by knocking Sithchatchawal down three times in the third round—causing the referee to stop the bout. Caballero has defended the title five times with the last one being that he knocked out Elvis Meija in one round.

On November 21, 2008, Caballero knocked out the unbeaten IBF Super Bantamweight champion Steve Molitor in the 4th round at the Casino Rama, Ontario. With the victory, he added the IBF title with his WBA crown. Caballero won his first defense on both titles with a split decision win over Jeffery Mathebula on April 30, 2009. He defended the titles for second time on August 29 in the same year against Francisco Leal who conceded in the 8th round.

Caballero was stripped of his IBF title on February 5, 2010 for failing to have a defense against Takalani Ndlovu, his mandatory challenger in that sanctioning body, in a timely manner. On April 10, 2010, Caballero defeated Daud Yordan. After that fight Celestino expressed his high interest in fighting Cuban Gold Medalist Yuriorkis Gamboa but that fight failed to come off being unsuccessful in securing a fight at Featherweight. Celestino was able to schedule a fight with Junior Lightweight Jason Litzau at the MGM Grand Garden Arena in Las Vegas on the opening bout of the HBO Televised undercard of Juan Manuel Marquez vs. Michael Katsidis on November 27. Cabellero subsequently, lost that fight via unanimous decision.

Celestino Caballero has dropped from Junior Lightweight to Featherweight division for a career-high against Jonathan Victor Barros, champion in property of the WBA version of this division, which fight is dated for June 18, 2011 and to take place at Mendoza, Argentina.

The WBC final Featherweight eliminator ordered by the World Boxing Council between Caballero and the Romanian Viorel Simion (16-0, 7KOs), with the winner landing a shot at current champion Daniel Ponce de León, should have taken place on a date in spring 2013. The  fight did not happen, however.

Professional boxing record

References

External links

1976 births
Living people
World Boxing Association champions
International Boxing Federation champions
Panamanian male boxers
World super-bantamweight boxing champions
Super-featherweight boxers
World featherweight boxing champions
Panamanian drug traffickers